The common dwarf skink (Menetia amaura) is a species of skink found in Western Australia.

References

Menetia
Reptiles described in 1978
Skinks of Australia
Endemic fauna of Australia
Taxa named by Glen Milton Storr